Charles William Hew Machell (born 25 October 1994) is an English professional footballer who plays as a midfielder or centre-back for Lexington SC.

Youth career 
Machell started his career with his hometown team Newcastle United, featuring for Newcastle's academy and played alongside Watford's Will Hughes as an England youth international. The Newcastle born midfielder was in the Magpies' youth academy until he was released aged sixteen. He then spent a brief spell in fellow North East club Darlington's academy before making the decision to move to America to study and continue his football education.

In 2013, Machell moved to the US, playing for Wingate University and appeared in all 17 matches during his first year at Wingate, starting 10 contests and registered five goals and two assists. The following year saw him winning the 2014 South Atlantic Conference player of the year award and was part of an NSCAA third-team All-American selection. He started all 20 matches as a sophomore, collecting 12 goals and four assist and led the SAC in goals and points.

Machell then spent one season with the East Tennessee State University after transferring from Wingate Bulldogs and helped propel ETSU to its first at-large appearance in the NCAA tournament in 2016, starting in 18 matches for ETSU and finished the 2016 season with three assists.

Club career

Thisted FC 
After completing his studies, Machell attended trials with US clubs as well as a combine in New York with several Danish agents and coaches in attendance. He was then approached by an agent and also the head coach of Thisted FC who invited him on a pre-season trial with the club. Machell then signed his first professional contract after he penned a one-year contract with Thisted FC of the Danish 1st Division. In total, he made 19 appearances in the Danish second tier for Thisted FC in his one and only season with them.

07 Vestur 
Machell then moved on to top flight Faroe Islands side 07 Vestur.

Svay Rieng 
Machell then signed for Cambodian side Svay Rieng FC for the 2019 C-League season. He helped the team to an unbeatable tally of 65 points from 25 games, sealing up the title for the provincial side.

Hougang United 
Machell signed for Singaporean side Hougang United FC for the 2020 Singapore Premier League season, where the club will also be participating in the 2020 AFC Cup.

Machell made his competitive debut and scored his first goal for the Cheetahs in Hougang's AFC Cup debut, smashing in an unstoppable half-volley into the back of the net and helping his new club to a 3–1 win over Lao Toyota in Vientiane.

In February 2021, Machell returned to Cambodia to join Visakha.

Perak 

On 17 June 2021, it was announced that Machell had joined Malaysia Super League side Perak.

In January 2022, Machell joined Oman Professional League side Al-Ittihad Club.

In March 2022, Machell returned to the US to join USL League One side FC Tucson.

In January 2023, Machell joined newly-formed USL League One side Lexington.

Club career statistics

Honours

Club
Svay Rieng
Cambodian League: 2019

Individual

 South Atlantic Conference Player of the Year: 2014

References

Living people
1994 births
English footballers
English expatriate footballers
Hougang United FC players
English expatriate sportspeople in Singapore
Expatriate footballers in Singapore
East Tennessee State Buccaneers men's soccer players
Wingate University alumni
Association football midfielders
English expatriate sportspeople in Denmark
English expatriate sportspeople in Cambodia
Singapore Premier League players
Faroe Islands Premier League players
Danish 1st Division players
Thisted FC players
07 Vestur players
Preah Khan Reach Svay Rieng FC players
Expatriate footballers in Oman
FC Tucson players
USL League One players
Expatriate soccer players in the United States
Expatriate men's footballers in Denmark
Expatriate footballers in the Faroe Islands
Expatriate footballers in Malaysia
Expatriate footballers in Cambodia
English expatriate sportspeople in Malaysia
English expatriate sportspeople in Oman
Oman Professional League players
Malaysia Super League players
Perak F.C. players
Lexington SC players